The 2022–23 West Indies Championship is the 55th edition of the Regional Four Day Competition, the domestic first-class cricket competition for the countries of the Cricket West Indies (CWI). It begun on 1 February and wil finish on 1 April 2023. Six teams are contesting the tournament – Barbados Pride, Guyana Harpy Eagles, Jamaica Scorpions, the Leeward Islands Hurricanes, Trinidad and Tobago Red Force, and the Windward Islands Volcanoes. The series will be followed by the Headley–Weekes Trophy. The first two rounds of fixtures took place in February 2022, followed by a break until 15 March 2022. Barbados are the defending champions.

Fixtures

Round 1

Round 2

Round 3

References

External links
 Series home at ESPN Cricinfo

2022 in West Indian cricket
Regional Four Day Competition seasons
West Indies Championship